The Attorney-General of Western Australia is the member of the Government of Western Australia responsible for maintenance and improvement of Western Australia's system of law and justice.  Before the advent of representative government in 1870, the title was Advocate-General of Western Australia.  The Attorney-General must be a qualified legal practitioner. When there are none in the cabinet, a lay person is sometimes appointed to the office of Minister for Justice. 

The current Attorney-General of Western Australia, since 17 March 2017, is John Quigley who administers the portfolio through the Department of Justice and a range of other agencies.

One of Quigley's predecessors Christian Porter went on to become Federal Attorney General.

List of attorneys
This is a list of Attorneys-General of Western Australia, or any precedent titles. The office of Attorney-General was not always filled: the Australian Parliamentary Library notes that where there was no lawyer among the ministers elected, there would be a Minister for Justice instead of an Attorney-General.

References

Western